Conocephalus melaenus, sometimes known as the black-kneed conehead or black-kneed meadow katydid is a species of Tettigoniidae found in China, Taiwan, Japan, Nepal, India, Indo-China and western Malesia.

Description
This medium-sized conehead has hind femora with knees darkened: which is diagnostic.  The crimson-orange nymphs are quite noticeable in the grasses and shrubs where they develop.

Gallery

References

External links

melaenus
Orthoptera of Asia
Insects described in 1842